Vanderbilt Commodores football All-Americans are American football players who have been named as All-Americans while playing for the Vanderbilt University football team.

Overview
Since 1906, 18 Vanderbilt Commodores football players have earned first-team All-American honors.

Owsley Manier was the first ever Commodore selected All-American, making Walter Camp's third-team. Bob Blake was the first to make an All-America first team.  Lynn Bomar was the first Vanderbilt player selected first-team All-American by Camp and the first consensus All-American. Camp rarely saw Southern players and thus rarely selected Southern players. Bomar was his only ever first-team selection from teams in the current Southeastern Conference.

5 Vanderbilt players have been consensus All-American selections: Lynn Bomar; Hek Wakefield; Pete Gracey;  George Deiderich; and Jim Arnold.

Sortable chart of Vanderbilt's All-Americans

References

Vanderbilt Commodores

Tennessee sports-related lists